Es Mal Pas is a coastal village in Formentera, Balearic Islands, Spain. It is located southeast by road from Ses Bardetes.

Populated places in Formentera